Stanworth is a surname. Notable people with the surname include:

 David Stanworth, maintainer of Snafu Comics
 Jim Stanworth (1871–1955), Australian rules footballer
 John Stanworth (born 1960), English cricketer